Abdullahi Sheikh Mohamed (born 30 November 1982) is a Somali former footballer. With 3 international goals, he is the all-time top scorer for the Somalia national football team.

Career statistics

International

International goals
Scores and results list Somalia's goal tally first.

References

1982 births
Living people
Association football midfielders
Somalian footballers
Somalia international footballers
Elman FC players